Atacta is a genus of flies in the family Tachinidae and a United States' electronic music act.

Species
A. argentifrons Aldrich, 1925
A. brasiliensis Schiner, 1868
A. crassiceps Aldrich, 1925
A. crescentis (Townsend, 1916)

References

Diptera of North America
Exoristinae
Tachinidae genera
Taxa named by Ignaz Rudolph Schiner